Ivan LaHaie is an electrical engineer with Integrity Applications, Inc. in Ann Arbor, Michigan. He was named a Fellow of the Institute of Electrical and Electronics Engineers (IEEE) in 2014 for his contributions to near-to-far field radar signature transformations and radar measurement error mitigation.

References

Fellow Members of the IEEE
Living people
Year of birth missing (living people)
Place of birth missing (living people)
American electrical engineers